Gath-hepher or Gat Hefer was a border town in ancient Israel. It was the home of the prophet Jonah. The etymology of the name is literally "wine-press of the digging" and is mentioned twice in the Bible at Joshua 19:13 and 2 Kings 14:25. In Joshua, a copying error has resulted in the form Gittah-hepher.

Jerome in Roman Times (Commentary on Jonah) describes the town as "an inconsiderable village" and tells that the tomb of Jonah was nearby. Similarly the medieval geographer Benjamin of Tudela also relates the tomb of Jonah in his travels to the area.

Today the site, at Latitude 32° 44' 30" N and Longitude 35° 19' 30" E in the Galilee, is a small set of ruins on a hilltop near the Arab village of el-Meshed five kilometres north of Nazareth and one kilometre from Canna. The supposed tomb of Jonah is still pointed out by locals.

References

Archaeological sites in Israel
Hebrew Bible cities